Phoenix Rising (subtitled "Coverdale • Hughes • Bolin • Paice • Lord") is a combo CD/DVD live album by the Mark IV line-up of Deep Purple, released in May 2011. It includes rare live tracks from Mk IV history, Rises Over Japan, a (30 minute) concert film directed by Tony Klinger, Gettin' Tighter, an 80 minute new music documentary about the band's 1975/1976 tour, and some extras.

Overview
The concert film Rises Over Japan was made at Budokan Hall on 15 December 1975. The concert was released on LP in an incomplete form as Last Concert in Japan in 1977 and the whole concert was issued in 2001 as This Time Around: Live in Tokyo. The footage was shot professionally with multiple cameras on 16mm film. Despite this, for many years only very poor quality bootleg copies from an obscure Japanese VHS release circulated among fans and collectors. Finally, after over 36 years the concert was restored from the original 31 minute print and released as a bonus feature on the "Deep Purple: Phoenix Rising" Blu-ray Disc in 2011, complete with the original stereo sound mix and a new 5.1 surround sound mix.

In May 2012, "Phoenix Rising" won German Leserwahl award as the Best Music Blu-ray.

Track listing

CD and 2LP
The Official Soundtrack and More –  Rare Live Tracks from MKIV History  (digitally remastered in 2011)
 "Burn" – 8:09 (Longbeach) {from Burn (1974)}
 "Getting Tighter" – 15:04 (Japan) {from Come Taste the Band (1975)}
 "Love Child" – 4:23 (Japan) {from Come Taste the Band (1975)}
 "Smoke on the Water" (including "Georgia") – 9:29 (Japan) {from Machine Head (1972)}

 "Lazy" (includes drum solo) – 11:41 (Japan) {from Machine Head (1972)}
 "Homeward Strut" – 5:44 (Longbeach) {from Teaser (1975)}
 "You Keep on Moving" – 5:44 (Japan) {from Come Taste the Band (1975)}
 "Stormbringer" – 9:49 (Longbeach) {from Stormbringer (1974)}

 Tracks recorded in Japan are taken from the album This Time Around: Live in Tokyo
 Tracks recorded in Longbeach are taken from the album King Biscuit Flower Hour Presents: Deep Purple in Concert

DVD and Blu-Ray
Deep Purple Rises Over Japan  (30 minute concert)
 "Burn" (Ritchie Blackmore, David Coverdale, Glenn Hughes, Jon Lord, Ian Paice)
 "Love Child" (Tommy Bolin, Coverdale)
 "Smoke on the Water" (Blackmore, Ian Gillan, Roger Glover, Lord, Paice)
 "You Keep on Moving" (Coverdale, Hughes)
 "Highway Star" (Blackmore, Gillan, Glover, Lord, Paice)

Gettin' Tighter (The untold story of the 1975/1976 MKIV World Tour)  (80 minute music documentary)
Extras 
Jakarta, December 1975 – Interview with Jon Lord & Glenn Hughes 
Come Taste the Band – Electronic Press Kit

Personnel 
Deep Purple
Tommy Bolin - Guitar, vocals
David Coverdale - Lead vocals
Glenn Hughes - Bass, vocals
Jon Lord - Keyboards, organ, backing vocals
Ian Paice - Drums, percussion

Chart performance

External links

Deep Purple video albums
2011 live albums
2011 video albums
Live video albums
Deep Purple live albums